Klepacki (feminine Klepacka) is a Polish surname. Notable people with the surname include:
 Frank Klepacki, American musician, video game composer and sound director
 Jeffrey Klepacki (born 1968), American rower
 Zofia Klepacka (born 1986), Polish windsurfer

Polish-language surnames